Subway Riders (also known as Os Viajantes da Noite) is a 1981 American thriller film directed by Amos Poe and starring Robbie Coltrane, Charlene Kaleina, Cookie Mueller, John Lurie and Amos Poe.

Cast
 Susan Tyrrell - Eleanor Langley
 Robbie Coltrane - Detective Fritz Langley
 John Lurie - The Saxophonist
 Amos Poe - Writer Ant
 Cookie Mueller - Penelope Trasher
 Charlene Kaleina - Claire Smith
 William Rice - Mr. Gollstone
 Ed Buck

References

External links
 

1981 films
American thriller films
Films set in New York City
1981 thriller films
1980s English-language films
1980s American films
 SUBWAY RIDERS